Moms is a 2012 Russian anthology film. It consists of eight short films which are set on 8 March, the International Women's Day.

Plot
Every year, on March 8,  telephone networks of Russia transmit millions of calls and SMS messages. Hardworking analysts have calculated that the absolute majority of telephone calls are addressed to the most important women in the life of every man — mothers.

Cast 
 Elena Korikova —  segment  My Beloved 
 Olga Volkova —  segment  My Beloved 
 Yuliya Grishina —  segment  My Beloved 
 Tatyana Kosmacheva —  segment  My Beloved 
 Sergey Bezrukov —  segment  My Beloved 
 Yekaterina Vasilyeva – segment  I am not Kolya
 Alexandra Nazarova – segment  I am not Kolya
 Mikhail Porechenkov – segment  I am not Kolya
 Mikhail Gorevoy – segment  I am not Kolya
 Marina Golub – segment Parachute
 Ekaterina Artemenko – segment Parachute
 Fyodor Dobronravov – segment Parachute
 Ivan Dobronravov – segment Parachute
 Liya Akhedzhakova – segment  Partner 
 Olga Makeeva –   segment  Partner 
 Dmitri Dyuzhev –  segment  Partner 
 Pyotr Fyodorov – segment  Partner 
 Ravshana Kurkova – segment  Father and son
 Egor Beroev – segment Father and son

References

External links 

2012 comedy films
2012 films
Russian anthology films
Russian comedy-drama films